(born 14 August 1944, Kobe) is a Japanese singer and actor. He is the father of actor Jundai Yamada.

He appeared in Sukima Kaze, which sold over a million copies. His acting credits include 18 films. On television, he specialized in jidaigeki roles, appearing as the first Suke-san in Mito Kōmon (seasons 1 and 2); his son Jundai Yamada played Kaku-san in the same show (seasons 29 to 31). He played the lead character in Ōedo Sōsamō, appearing from 1970-74. In the 1971–72 season he portrayed Isshin Tasuke in a series of the same name, and from 1975 to 1977 he played Tōyama no Kin-san; his Sukima Kaze was the theme song. With former Miss Universe contestant Hisako Manda he starred in Kenka-ya Ukon (1992–94).

Filmography

Film
 Tokyo Drifter 2: The Sea is Bright Red as the Color of Love (1966)
Man Who Causes a Storm (1966)
A Colt Is My Passport (1967)

Television
Moeyo Ken (1966) – Okita Sōji
Mito Kōmon (1969) – Sukesan
Ten to Chi to (1969) – Oda Nobunaga
Ōedo Sōsamō (1970–74) – Jūmonji Koyata
Kunitori Monogatari (1973) – Azai Nagamasa
Takeda Shingen (1988) – Hōjō Ujiyasu
Tokugawa Yoshinobu (1998) – Ii Naosuke

Honours 
Medal with Green ribbon (2008)
Medal with Purple Ribbon (2009)
Person of Cultural Merit (2016)

References

External links
 Official site
 Ryotaro Sugi profile, IMDb.com
 杉良太郎 Profile, JMDB.ne.jp

1944 births
Japanese male actors
Japanese male singers
People from Kobe
Living people
Musicians from Kobe
Recipients of the Medal with Purple Ribbon
Persons of Cultural Merit